POETS day is a term used by workers in the United Kingdom and Australia to refer jocularly to Friday as the last day of the work week. The word "POETS" is an acronym for "Piss off early, tomorrow's Saturday": hence Friday becomes "Poets day". It is tradition to begin the POETS day at 3:30p.m. Variations on this are "Punch out early, tomorrow's Saturday" (referring to a manual punch time clock), "Push off early, tomorrow's Saturday" and "Push off early, tomorrow's Sunday" (based on the old 6-day work week). 

It also is a backronym, to be read as in "A Poets Day Dream."

The Waterloo Engineering Society at the University of Waterloo, has an on-campus pub named POETS. The official expansion of the name is "Piss on everything, tomorrow's Saturday". The University of Calgary's Schulich School of Engineering also has a weekly meeting/party with the same expansion of POETS.

See also
 Waiting for the Weekend
 :wikt:thank God it's Friday

References

External links

BBC h2g2 entry

Acronyms
Friday